Dąbrowa (Polish for "oak forest") may refer to:

Places in Poland

Greater Poland Voivodeship

Dąbrowa, Gniezno County, a settlement in Gmina Trzemeszno
Dąbrowa, Jarocin County, a village in Gmina Jarocin
Dąbrowa, Kalisz County, a village in Gmina Koźminek
Dąbrowa, Koło County, a village in Gmina Koło
Dąbrowa, Konin County, a village in Gmina Sompolno
Dąbrowa, Gmina Krotoszyn, a village in Krotoszyn County
Dąbrowa, Gmina Rozdrażew, a village in Krotoszyn County
Dąbrowa, Gmina Kuślin, a village in Nowy Tomyśl County
Dąbrowa, Gmina Zbąszyń, a settlement in Nowy Tomyśl County
Dąbrowa, Poznań County, a village in Gmina Dopiewo
Dąbrowa, Rawicz County, a village in Gmina Miejska Górka
Dąbrowa, Słupca County, a village in Gmina Lądek
Dąbrowa, Śrem County, a village in Gmina Śrem
Dąbrowa, Środa Wielkopolska County, a settlement in Gmina Nowe Miasto nad Wartą
Dąbrowa, Gmina Pniewy, a settlement in Szamotuły County
Dąbrowa, Gmina Wronki, a village in Szamotuły County
Dąbrowa, Gmina Brudzew, a village in Turek County
Dąbrowa, Gmina Dobra, a village in Turek County
Dąbrowa, Gmina Przykona, a village in Turek County
Dąbrowa, Wągrowiec County, a village in Gmina Damasławek

Kuyavian-Pomeranian Voivodeship
Dąbrowa, Mogilno County, a village in Gmina Dąbrowa
Gmina Dąbrowa, Kuyavian-Pomeranian Voivodeship, a rural administrative division in Mogilno County
Dąbrowa, Sępólno County, a village in Gmina Kamień Krajeński

Lesser Poland Voivodeship
Dąbrowa County, a unit of territorial administration and local government (powiat)
Dąbrowa, Nowy Sącz County, a village in Gmina Chełmiec
Dąbrowa, Wieliczka County, a village in Gmina Kłaj

Łódź Voivodeship

Dąbrowa, Gmina Kleszczów, a settlement in Bełchatów County
Dąbrowa, Gmina Rusiec, a village in Bełchatów County
Dąbrowa, Gmina Zelów, a village in Bełchatów County
Dąbrowa, Brzeziny County, a village in Gmina Jeżów
Dąbrowa, Łask County, a village in Gmina Buczek
Dąbrowa, Łowicz County, a village in Gmina Zduny
Dąbrowa, Łódź East County, a village in Gmina Nowosolna
Dąbrowa, Opoczno County, a village in Gmina Sławno
Dąbrowa, Pabianice County, a village in Gmina Dłutów
Dąbrowa, Gmina Kiełczygłów, a village in Pajęczno County
Dąbrowa, Gmina Sulmierzyce, a village in Pajęczno County
Dąbrowa, Piotrków County, a village in Gmina Łęki Szlacheckie
Dąbrowa, Poddębice County, a village in Gmina Uniejów
Dąbrowa, Radomsko County, a village in Gmina Kamieńsk
Dąbrowa, Gmina Inowłódz, a village in Tomaszów Mazowiecki County
Dąbrowa, Gmina Lubochnia, a village in Tomaszów Mazowiecki County
Dąbrowa, Gmina Tomaszów Mazowiecki, a village in Tomaszów Mazowiecki County
Dąbrowa, Wieluń County, a village in Gmina Wieluń
Dąbrowa, Zgierz County, a village in Gmina Głowno
Dąbrowa Widawska, a village in Gmina Widawa, Łask County

Lower Silesian Voivodeship

Dąbrowa, Milicz County, a village in Gmina Krośnice
Dąbrowa, Gmina Oleśnica, a village in Oleśnica County
Dąbrowa, Gmina Twardogóra, a village in Oleśnica County
Dąbrowa, Polkowice County, a village in Gmina Polkowice

Lublin Voivodeship

Dąbrowa, Gmina Hrubieszów, a village in Hrubieszów County
Dąbrowa, Gmina Mircze, a village in Hrubieszów County
Dąbrowa, Gmina Annopol, a village in Kraśnik County
Dąbrowa, Gmina Trzydnik Duży, a village in Kraśnik County
Dąbrowa, Gmina Ludwin, a village in Łęczna County
Dąbrowa, Gmina Milejów, a village in Łęczna County
Dąbrowa, Lublin County, a village in Gmina Borzechów
Dąbrowa, Gmina Krynice, a village in Tomaszów Lubelski County
Dąbrowa, Gmina Tomaszów Lubelski, a village in Tomaszów Lubelski County
Dąbrowa, Zamość County, a village in Gmina Łabunie

Lubusz Voivodeship
Dąbrowa, Zielona Góra County, a village in Gmina Zabór
Dąbrowa, Żary County, a village in Gmina Lubsko

Masovian Voivodeship

Dąbrowa, Ciechanów County, a village in Gmina Ojrzeń
Dąbrowa, Garwolin County, a village in Gmina Łaskarzew
Dąbrowa, Gmina Mogielnica, a village in Grójec County
Dąbrowa, Gmina Nowe Miasto nad Pilicą, a village in Grójec County
Dąbrowa, Lipsko County, a village in Gmina Ciepielów
Dąbrowa, Gmina Mrozy, a village in Mińsk County
Dąbrowa, Gmina Siennica, a village in Mińsk County
Dąbrowa, Mława County, a village in Gmina Strzegowo
Dąbrowa, Nowy Dwór Mazowiecki County, a village in Gmina Nasielsk
Dąbrowa, Ostrołęka County, a village in Gmina Baranowo
Dąbrowa, Ostrów Mazowiecka County, a village in Gmina Andrzejewo
Dąbrowa, Przasnysz County, a village in Gmina Chorzele
Dąbrowa, Przysucha County, a village in Gmina Odrzywół
Dąbrowa, Gmina Mokobody, a village in Siedlce County
Dąbrowa, Gmina Przesmyki, a village in Siedlce County
Dąbrowa, Sokołów County, a village in Gmina Sokołów Podlaski
Dąbrowa, Gmina Korytnica, a village in Węgrów County
Dąbrowa, Gmina Łochów, a village in Węgrów County
Dąbrowa, Wyszków County, a village in Gmina Rząśnik
Dąbrowa, Żuromin County, a village in Gmina Żuromin

Opole Voivodeship
Dąbrowa, Namysłów County, a village in Gmina Świerczów
Gmina Dąbrowa, Opole Voivodeship, a rural administrative district in Opole County
Dąbrowa, Opole County, a village in Gmina Dąbrowa

Podlaskie Voivodeship

Dąbrowa, Gmina Kleszczele, a settlement in Hajnówka County
Dąbrowa, Gmina Narewka, a village in Hajnówka County
Dąbrowa, Gmina Grabowo, a village in Kolno County
Dąbrowa, Gmina Stawiski, a village in Kolno County

Pomeranian Voivodeship

Dąbrowa, Kartuzy County, a village in Gmina Stężyca, Kartuzy County
Dąbrowa, Kościerzyna County, a village in Gmina Karsin
Dąbrowa, Malbork County, a village in Gmina Lichnowy
Dąbrowa, Puck County, a settlement in Gmina Krokowa
Dąbrowa, Starogard County, a village in Gmina Kaliska

Silesian Voivodeship

Dąbrowa, Częstochowa County, a village in Gmina Koniecpol
Dąbrowa, Gmina Popów, a village in Kłobuck County
Dąbrowa, Gmina Przystajń, a village in Kłobuck County
Dąbrowa Górnicza, a city

Subcarpathian Voivodeship
Dąbrowa, Lubaczów County, a village in Gmina Lubaczów
Dąbrowa, Rzeszów County, a village in Gmina Świlcza
Dąbrowa, Stalowa Wola County, a village in Gmina Zaklików

Świętokrzyskie Voivodeship
Dąbrowa, Kielce County, a village in Gmina Masłów
Dąbrowa, Końskie County, a village in Gmina Fałków
Dąbrowa, Starachowice County, a village in Gmina Pawłów

Warmian-Masurian Voivodeship

Dąbrowa, Gmina Bartoszyce, a village in Bartoszyce County
Dąbrowa, Gmina Bisztynek, a village in Bartoszyce County
Dąbrowa, Braniewo County, a village in Gmina Płoskinia
Dąbrowa, Iława County, a village in Gmina Iława
Dąbrowa, Kętrzyn County, a village in Gmina Kętrzyn
Dąbrowa, Ostróda County, a village in Gmina Dąbrówno
Dąbrowa, Gmina Dźwierzuty, a village in Szczytno County
Dąbrowa, Gmina Wielbark, a village in Szczytno County

West Pomeranian Voivodeship
Dąbrowa, Kamień County, a village in Gmina Świerzno
Dąbrowa, Koszalin County, a village in Gmina Sianów
Dąbrowa, Myślibórz County, a village in Gmina Myślibórz
Dąbrowa (Rościn), a settlement in Gmina Myślibórz, Myślibórz County
Dąbrowa, Szczecinek County, a village in Gmina Szczecinek

Other areas
Dąbrowa Basin or Zagłębie Dąbrowskie, a geographical and historical region in southern Poland

Places in the Czech Republic
Dąbrowa (Polish name for Doubrava), a village in Karviná District

See also
 
 Dąbrowa coat of arms
 Doubrava (disambiguation)
 Dubrava (disambiguation)